Coronations in Poland officially began in 1025 and continued until 1764, when the final king of an independent Poland, Stanisław August Poniatowski, was crowned at St. John's Cathedral in Warsaw. Most Polish coronations took place at the Wawel Cathedral in Kraków, but crownings also occurred in Poznań and at Gniezno Cathedral. Whenever practical, Polish coronations were conducted as close as possible as to the date of the previous sovereign's funeral. This was explained by Joachim Bielski in the sixteenth century as osoba umiera, korona nie umiera, or "the person dies, the crown dies not".  With the emergence of an independent, republican Poland after World War I, coronations in the Polish state have been rendered obsolete.

Though many of the Polish Crown Jewels were stolen and destroyed by King Frederick William III of Prussia in March 1809 after the Third Partition of Poland, remaining pieces are exhibited at the Wawel Royal Castle National Art Collection and National Museum in Warsaw.

The ceremony 
During the period when coronations were held in Kraków, the following order was observed: on the eve of his coronation, the new monarch fasted, gave alms, and partook of the Catholic sacrament of confession. He then walked on foot from the royal Wawel Castle to the Basilica of St. Stanisław, patron saint of Poland. Unlike the remainder of the service, the royal procession was opened to the Polish masses. On the morning of the ceremony, the king was met in his bedchamber by a procession consisting of the local Metropolitan Archbishop and other notables. Wearing Episcopal clothing, the monarch was blessed with holy water and incensed. Following this, king, metropolitan and the others made their way in procession to the cathedral.

Inside the church, the Polish regalia were laid on the high altar, while the king was seated on a low chair nearby. The royal oath was administered, and the new monarch then knelt before the altar. Two mitred abbots next entered from a side chapel, carrying a mixture of holy oils, with which the ruler was then anointed. Following this, the king was handed a sword, which he used to trace a cross in the air. Next he was crowned by the Archbishop, assisted by two other bishops, following which he received his orb and scepter. The high mass continued, with the newly crowned sovereign receiving Holy Communion, then kissing a crucifix and mounting his throne. Following this, the king created several new knights, then attended a coronation feast and rode into the public square on horseback, where he received the homage of his subjects while seated in a large chair.

List of Polish coronations 

* "K" indicates a king or queen regnant; "Q" indicates a queen consort.

Pretenders and royal consorts not crowned
 Wenceslaus III of Bohemia, assassinated before crowning
 Wiola of Cieszyn, wife of Wenceslaus III of Bohemia, daughter of Mieszko of Cieszyn, Duke of Cieszyn
 Jadwiga of Żagań, wife of Casimir III of Poland, daughter of Henryk Żelazny, Duke of Żagań
 Elizabeth of Bosnia, wife of Louis the Great, daughter of Stephen II, Ban of Bosnia
 Helena of Moscow, wife of Alexander Jagiellon, daughter of Ivan III, Grand Duke of Moscow, not crowned because of her Orthodox faith
 Christiane Eberhardine of Brandenburg-Bayreuth, wife of August II the Strong, daughter of Christian Ernst, Margrave of Brandenburg-Bayreuth, not crowned because of her Protestant faith

Further reading
  Michał Rożek, Polskie koronacje i korony, Krajowa Agencja Wydawnicza, Kraków 1987

References

External links

  Koronacje królów i królowych polskich 
  Zarys historii regaliów Królestwa Polskiego

See also
 List of Polish monarchs
 Polish Crown Jewels
 Royal Road, Kraków
 St. Florian's Church
 Vivente Rege

Polish monarchy
Poland
Kingdom of Poland
 
Ceremonies in Poland